Raymond Group is an Indian branded fabric and fashion retailer, incorporated in 1925. It produces suiting fabric, with a capacity of producing 31 million meters of wool and wool-blended fabrics. 

The group owns apparel brands like Raymond, Raymond Premium Apparel, Raymond Made to Measure, Ethnix, Park Avenue, Park Avenue Woman ColorPlus, Kamasutra & Parx. All the brands are retailed through 'The Raymond Shop' (TRS), with a network of over 700 retail shops spread across India and overseas, in over 200 cities.

In addition, the group also has business interests in readymade garments, designer wear, cosmetics & toiletries, engineering files and tools, prophylactics and air charter operations.

In 2019, Raymonds announced its venture into real estate business under Raymond Realty. The new venture is poised to start with an investment of ₹250 crore (approx $36 million) in developing mid-income and premium housing units on 20 acres of land in the growing suburb of Thane. Raymond group holds over 125 acres of land in this region.

Recognitions
 The Brand Trust Report 2014 ranked Raymond at 23rd among the most trusted brands of India.

See also
 Lodhikheda
 Make in India

References

External links
 

Textile companies of India
Conglomerate companies of India
Companies based in Mumbai
Design companies established in 1925
Retail companies established in 1925
1925 establishments in India
Clothing brands of India